Adlan Abuevich Varayev (2 January 1962 – 4 May 2016) was a Russian-Chechen welterweight freestyle wrestler who won a silver medal at the 1988 Olympics. He won the 1987 World Championships, beating Dave Schultz in the final, and placed second in 1986. Varayev held the European welterweight title in 1986–1988. After retiring from competitions worked as a wrestling coach and administrator. He trained the Russian national freestyle team and served as vice-president of the Russian Wrestling Federation. He accidentally drowned after a bad fall into the Argun River.

References

1962 births
2016 deaths
Soviet male sport wrestlers
Olympic wrestlers of the Soviet Union
Wrestlers at the 1988 Summer Olympics
Russian male sport wrestlers
Olympic silver medalists for the Soviet Union
Olympic medalists in wrestling
Chechen martial artists
Chechen sportsmen
Honoured Masters of Sport of the USSR
World Wrestling Championships medalists
Medalists at the 1988 Summer Olympics
Deaths by drowning
Accidental deaths in Russia
European Wrestling Championships medalists